Uherský Brod is a town in Uherské Hradiště District in the Zlín Region of the Czech Republic. It has about 16,000 inhabitants. The historic town centre is well preserved and is protected by law as an urban monument zone.

Administrative parts
Villages of Havřice, Maršov, Těšov and Újezdec are administrative parts of Uherský Brod.

Etymology
The name means literally "Hungarian Ford". It refers to its historical location near a ford across the local river Olšava and near the border with Kingdom of Hungary.

Geography
It lies in the Vizovice Highlands on the Olšava River.

History

The first written mentions of Uherský Brod are from 1030 and 1048, when customs were collected here in a locality called Na Brodě. Location by trade routes and suitable climatic conditions led to the development of the settlement called Brod to a town. In 1272, the village was promoted to a royal town by King Ottokar II of Bohemia. In 1275, the name Uherský Brod was first used.

Uherský Brod became a border fortress town which had to face the Hungarian invasions. During the Hussite Wars, the town surrendered to the Hussites and became their military base. After the Hussite Wars, the town suffered from the war between George of Poděbrady and Matthias Corvinus. Uherský Brod was acquired by lords of Kunovice in 1506 and during their rule, the town prospered and developed.

The good times came to an end in the early 17th century when Hungarians started to attack it in a series of invasions. In 1611, the town was bought by the Kaunitz family and began to lose its economic and cultural significance. In the 17th century, the town continued to suffer from wars and plague epidemics. Uherský Brod recovered in the 18th century and prosperity was affected not even by the large fire in 1735, the invasion of the Prussian Army in 1741–1742 and by cholera epidemic in 1757.

In the 19th century, German and Jewish communities began to grow. In the second half of the 19th century, the town was transformed by industrial development but managed to retain its character. In 1883–1888, the railway was built.

Uherský Brod shooting
On 24 February 2015, a shooting occurred at a restaurant in Uherský Brod. Nine people were killed, including the gunman.

Demographics

Economy
One of the largest employers in the region is Česká zbrojovka Uherský Brod, a firearms manufacturer. The engineering industry is also represented by Slovácké strojírny a.s., which was founded here in 1951.

Education
There is a gymnasium that bear name of John Amos Comenius. There are also three other secondary and vocational schools.

Sport
A local football club, ČSK Uherský Brod, plays in the Moravian–Silesian Football League (3rd tier of the Czech football league system).

Sights

The landmark of the main square is the Church of the Immaculate Conception. This three-nave baroque church was designed by Domenico Martinelli and built in 1717–1733. The -high tower was added in 1879–1881.

One of the oldest and largest monument in the region is the Dominican convent with the Church of the Assumption of the Virgin Mary. The original Gothic church from the early 14th century was much higher than the current structure. After it was damaged and burned down during the wars, it was rebuilt in the early Baroque style in the 1670s and the 1680s.

The Kounická street between the town square and the convent includes two important an valuable buildings of the town, the town hall and the manor house. The original late Gothic town hall was demolished in 1556 and replaced by a Renaissance one. It was baroque rebuilt in 1703–1715. The large Baroque manor house has preserved Gothic-Renaissance core. The Baroque reconstruction was also made by design of Domenico Martinelli. It has an arcaded courtyard with copies of renaissance columns. Today, the manor house serves the cultural and social purposes. There is a ceremonial hall, gallery, Gothic chapel of the Kaunitz family, library, and elementary art school.

A Baroque castle was built on the site of an old Gothic castle that was abandoned in the 17th century. Uherský Brod Castle was designed by D. Martinelli and was originally intended to be a large complex, however, after 1705, the construction did not continue and only a part was created. Today the castle houses the Museum of J. A. Comenius. Fragments of the town walls are preserved, especially in the neighbourhood of the castle. Three of four gates were demolished in 1874. The only preserved gate now forms the entrance to the Museum of J. A. Comenius.

On a hill above the town is an observatory from 1961, having been funded and built entirely by the town's residents. It also includes a planetarium in the town centre. The Planetary Trail is an educational trail with models of planets and the sun which runs through the town.

Notable people
John Amos Comenius (1592–1670), philosopher and pedagogue; possible birthplace, lived here
Moses Samuel Zuckermandl (1836–1917), Czech-German rabbi and theologian
Leo Jung (1892–1987), American rabbi
Ladislav Boháč (1907–1978), actor
Vlastimil Babula (born 1973), chess player

Twin towns – sister cities

Uherský Brod is twinned with:
 Gierałtowice, Poland
 Gooise Meren, Netherlands
 Nové Mesto nad Váhom, Slovakia
 Ourém, Portugal

References

External links

 

Cities and towns in the Czech Republic
Populated places in Uherské Hradiště District
Moravian Slovakia
Shtetls